Marigna-sur-Valouse is a commune in the Jura department and Bourgogne-Franche-Comté region of eastern France.

Geography
The Valouson, a tributary of the Valouse flows through the community.
The commune borders
 Nancuise in the North, 
 Chambéria in the East, 
 Valzin en Petite Montagne in the Southeast together with Savigna and Chatonnay, 
 La Boissière in the South,
 Montrevel and Monnetay in the West.

Population

See also
Communes of the Jura department

References

Communes of Jura (department)